Bradley Westell (1965/6 – 31 July 1995) was a British commercial diver who died in the North Sea off Bacton, Norfolk after his umbilical was dragged into one of the thrusters of the diving support vessel Stena Orelia. This indirectly led to the 1997 conviction of diving supervisor Kenneth Roberts for perverting the course of justice, and first prison sentence for a crime offshore working in the North Sea oil industry.

References

1995 deaths
Accidental deaths in England
Commercial diving accidents
Deaths by person in England
July 1995 events in the United Kingdom
Maritime incidents in 1995
Underwater diving deaths
Underwater diving in the United Kingdom